The 1931 Texas Longhorns football team was an American football team that represented the University of Texas (now known as the University of Texas at Austin) as a member of the Southwest Conference during the 1931 college football season. In their fifth season under head coach Clyde Littlefield, Texas compiled an 6–4 record and finished fifth in the SWC.

Schedule

References

Texas
Texas Longhorns football seasons
Texas Longhorns football